Hypolycaena coerulea, the shining fairy hairstreak, is a butterfly in the family Lycaenidae. It is found in Nigeria (the Niger Delta, the eastern part of the country and the Cross River loop) and western Cameroon. The habitat consists of primary forests.

References

Butterflies described in 1895
Hypolycaenini
Butterflies of Africa